The 1989 Montreal Expos season was the 21st season of the baseball franchise. With owner Charles Bronfman thinking of selling the team he founded, he contemplated taking one last shot at a playoff berth. Bronfman gave young general manager Dave Dombrowski a clear mandate to win now, reportedly telling him he would provided all the money needed in the quest to bring a championship to Montreal in 1989. Dombrowski pulled off a massive trade on May 25, acquiring star left-handed pitcher – and pending free agent – Mark Langston from the Seattle Mariners. While the move was viewed as a coup at the time, it came at a heavy cost as a young, very tall and very raw Randy Johnson was the key part of the package going to the Pacific Northwest. Johnson would eventually harness his fantastic stuff and became one of the game's most dominant left-handed pitchers for well over a decade. Langston pitched 4 months for the club and left as a free agent. Still, it seemed like a worthy gamble at the time for the Expos. That year, there was no dominant team in the National League. The team seemed poised to compete for the NL East crown with a loaded starting pitching staff that featured Langston, Dennis Martínez, Bryn Smith, Pascual Perez and Kevin Gross.

The team peaked on August 2 with an NL best record of 63–44, holding a 3-game lead in the NL East and everything running along smoothly. What followed would go down as the greatest collapse in franchise history. The next night, a Benny Distefano pinch hit single in the 12th inning dealt the Expos a 1–0 loss in Pittsburgh. It was the start of a 7-game losing streak. The club limped through the rest of August but remained in the race in early September, with the team being only 2 games back of 1st place on September 6. Regardless, the downward spiral continued as the Expos inexplicably ended up losing 37 of their final 55 games to finish the season a disappointing 81-81, well out of the playoff picture. The easiest analysis of what caused the collapse is to point to the offense, which struggled after August 2, scoring an MLB worst 3.23 runs per game. For long-time Expos fans, the collapse is viewed as the beginning of the end of the franchise. If the club had won the NL East title that year and then beaten the Giants in the NLCS, clinching a World Series berth in the process, Bronfman may have changed his mind about selling the team. Instead, the late season collapse after such a big win now move only added to the owner's frustration.

Offseason
 December 8, 1988: Tracy Jones was traded by the Expos to the San Francisco Giants for Mike Aldrete.
 December 8, 1988: John Dopson and Luis Rivera were traded by the Expos to the Boston Red Sox for Spike Owen and Dan Gakeler.

Spring training
The Expos held spring training at West Palm Beach Municipal Stadium in West Palm Beach, Florida – a facility they shared with the Atlanta Braves. It was their 13th season at the stadium; they had conducted spring training there from 1969 to 1972 and since 1981.

Regular season
 August 23, 1989: The Expos and Los Angeles Dodgers engage in a 22 inning marathon, the longest game in Expos history. It eventually ended when Rick Dempsey homered for the Dodgers in the top half of the 22nd innings off Dennis Martínez in a very rare relief performance. Rex Hudler was caught stealing second in the bottom half of the 22nd to end the game. The game would have ended earlier when an Expo scored from third on a sacrifice fly. The Dodgers' appeal, that the runner left the base too soon, was recognized by the third base umpire and the third out was recorded. The game also marked the first time that a mascot was ejected by an umpire. Youppi!, dressed in a nightgown and nightcap, pretended to go to sleep on top of the Dodgers dugout, former Montreal Royals reliever and then coach of the Dodgers Tommy Lasorda demanded that Youppi! be run from the game. In the end the game took over 6 hours to finish and ended close to 2:00 am.
 August 15, 1989: San Francisco Giants pitcher Dave Dravecky pitched three no-hit innings, but in the fifth inning, he felt a tingling sensation in his arm. In the sixth inning he started off shaky, allowing a home run to the lead off batter and then hitting the second batter. Then, on his first pitch to Tim Raines, his humerus bone snapped, ending his career.

Opening Day starters
 Hubie Brooks
 Tom Foley
 Andrés Galarraga
 Dave Martinez
 Dennis Martínez
 Spike Owen
 Tim Raines
 Nelson Santovenia
 Tim Wallach

Season standings

Record vs. opponents

Notable transactions
 May 25, 1989: Randy Johnson, Brian Holman, and Gene Harris were traded by the Expos to the Seattle Mariners for Mark Langston and a player to be named later. The Mariners completed the deal by sending Mike Campbell to the Expos on July 31.
 July 2, 1989: Sergio Valdez, Nate Minchey, and Kevin Dean (minors) were traded by the Expos to the Atlanta Braves for Zane Smith.
 July 27, 1989: Rick Carriger (minors) was traded by the Expos to the Cleveland Indians for Doug Piatt.
 August 29, 1989: Mike Blowers was traded by the Expos to the New York Yankees for John Candelaria.

Draft picks
June 5, 1989: 1989 Major League Baseball draft
Charles Johnson was drafted by the Expos in the 1st round (10th pick), but did not sign.
Doug Bochtler was drafted by the Expos in the 9th round. Player signed June 26, 1989.

Major League debuts
Batters:
Marquis Grissom (Aug 22)
Marty Pevey (May 16)
Larry Walker (Aug 16)
Pitchers:
Steve Frey (May 10)
Mark Gardner (May 16)
Gene Harris (Apr 5)

Roster

Player stats

Batting

Starters by position
Note: Pos = Position; G = Games played; AB = At bats; H = Hits; Avg. = Batting average; HR = Home runs; RBI = Runs batted in; SB = Stolen bases

Other batters
Note: G = Games played; AB = At bats; H = Hits; Avg. = Batting average; HR = Home runs; RBI = Runs batted in; SB = Stolen bases

Pitching

Starting pitchers
Note: G = Games played; IP = Innings pitched; W = Wins; L = Losses; ERA = Earned run average; SO = Strikeouts

Other pitchers
Note: G = Games pitched; IP = Innings pitched; W = Wins; L = Losses; ERA = Earned run average; SO = Strikeouts

Relief pitchers
Note: G = Games pitched; W = Wins; L = Losses; SV = Saves; ERA = Earned run average; SO = Strikeouts

Award winners
 Mark Langston, National League Pitcher of the Month, July
1989 Major League Baseball All-Star Game

Farm system

LEAGUE CHAMPIONS: Indianapolis, Jamestown

References

External links
 1989 Montreal Expos team at Baseball-Reference
 1989 Montreal Expos team at baseball-almanac.com

Montreal Expos seasons
Montreal Expos season
1980s in Montreal
1989 in Quebec